Billennium may refer to:

 2nd millennium, the second period of one thousand years in the Common Era
 3rd millennium, the period of time which began with the year 2001
 Beretta 92 Billennium, a type of pistol
 Unix billennium, a point in Unix time which occurred in 2001
 "Billennium" (short story), a short story by J. G. Ballard

See also 
 Biennial (disambiguation)